Pinaropappus, common name rocklettuce, is a genus of flowering plants in the tribe Cichorieae within the family Asteraceae, native to Mesoamerica and the southwestern United States.

 Species

References

Cichorieae
Asteraceae genera
Flora of Central America
Flora of Mexico